Oltman Jan ("Arnold") van Calker (born 16 September 1976, Gasselternijveenschemond) is a Dutch bobsledder, who has competed since 1999. His best World Cup finish was second in the four-man event Königssee, Germany in January 2009.

Van Calker also finished 17th in the four-man event at the 2002 Winter Olympics in Salt Lake City. He also finished 23rd in the two-man event at the FIBT World Championships 2005 in Calgary.

References
 http://www.fibt.com/index.php?id=47&tx_bzdstaffdirectory_pi1%5BshowUid%5D=100338&tx_bzdstaffdirectory_pi1%5BbackPid%5D=93 (FIBT profile)
 

1976 births
Living people
Bobsledders at the 2002 Winter Olympics
Dutch male bobsledders
Olympic bobsledders of the Netherlands
People from Aa en Hunze
Sportspeople from Drenthe